Forest Lake is a city in Washington County, Minnesota, United States, located 27 miles northeast of Saint Paul. The population was 20,611 at the 2020 census.  The 2021 population is 20,608.

History
Forest Lake began as a stop on the St. Paul and Duluth Railroad. The first train reached Forest Lake on December 23, 1868. The lake was so named for the abundant timber that lines its shores. Forest Lake Township was organized on March 11, 1874 by mayor Mark Galli. The first one-room school was built that year at the former location of city hall (220 N. Lake Street). The city of Forest Lake was incorporated on July 11, 1893 with 175 residents. In 2001, the city annexed the surrounding former Forest Lake Township.

Geography

Media
The first newspaper, The Enterprise, was printed in 1903. It was changed in 1907 to The Forest Lake Advertiser and later to The Forest Lake Times, in 1916, as it remains to this day.  The Forest Lake Lowdown is another local paper.

Demographics

Median household income for 2017 was $76,904.  Average household income was $93,296.  Per capita income was $35,334.

2010 census
As of the census of 2010, there were 18,375 people, 7,014 households, and 5,044 families residing in the city. The racial makeup of the city was 94.7% White, 1.1% African American, 0.4% Native American, 1.5% Asian, 0.1% Pacific Islander, 0.6% from other races, and 1.7% from two or more races. Hispanic or Latino of any race were 2.3% of the population.

There were 7,014 households, of which 36.8% had children under the age of 18 living with them, 56.2% were married couples living together, 10.7% had a female householder with no husband present, 5.1% had a male householder with no wife present, and 28.1% were non-families. 21.9% of all households were made up of individuals, and 7.6% had someone living alone who was 65 years of age or older. The average household size was 2.60 and the average family size was 3.04.

The median age in the city was 37.4 years. 26.3% of residents were under the age of 18; 7.6% were between the ages of 18 and 24; 27.1% were from 25 to 44; 27.7% were from 45 to 64; and 11.3% were 65 years of age or older. The gender makeup of the city was 49.7% male and 50.3% female.

Politics
Forest Lake is located in Minnesota's 6th congressional district.
 Mayor: Mara Bain	
 Council: Sam Husnik, Hanna Valento, Leif Erickson, Blake Roberts 
 City Administrator: Patrick Casey
 State Senator: Karin Housley	
 State Representative: Bob Dettmer

Public schools

The Forest Lake Area school system includes eight elementary sites, one middle school site, and one high school site. There are also two independent districts, North Lakes Academy and Lakes International Language Academy.

Elementary schools (grades K–6)
 Columbus (K–6)
 Forest Lake (4–6)
 Forest View (K–3)
Lakes International Language Academy (K–5)
 Lino Lakes (K–6 STEM)
 Linwood (K–6)
North Lakes Academy (K–5)
 St. Peter Catholic School (preschool–8)
 Scandia (K–6)
 Wyoming (K–6)

Secondary schools (grades 6–12)
North Lakes Academy (grades 6–12)
Lakes International Language Academy (grades 6–12)
 St. Peter Catholic School (grades 7–8)
 Forest Lake Area Middle School (grades 7–8)
 Forest Lake Area High School (grades 9–12)

Notable people

Academics

Arts and entertainment, journalists, writers 
 Dan Andersson, Swedish author, poet and composer, lived in Forest Lake in 1902.
 John Caddy, poet and naturalist is a resident of Forest Lake.
 Carol Muske-Dukes, poet and novelist, grew up in Forest Lake.
 Douglas Harper, sociologist, author, photographer, is a resident of Forest Lake and graduate of Forest Lake Area High School.
 Rich Matteson, jazz artist, educator, was born in Forest Lake.
 H. Keith Melton, author, is a resident of Forest Lake.
 Terry Redlin, popular American artist, lived in Forest Lake in the 1960s.
 Anni Rossi, is a singer, violist and keyboardist and recording artist on 4AD Records, and is a graduate of Forest Lake Area High School.
 Christopher Sieber, two-time Tony Award nominated actor (Spamalot and Shrek the Musical), is a graduate of Forest Lake Area High School.
 Jordis Unga, is a rock singer, songwriter and performer (Rock Star: INXS and The Voice) who attended Forest Lake Area High School.
 James "Mister Metokur" Augustine, retired internet personality, retired weatherman and hat salesman (Tumblrisms, Deviants, and The /x/ files-succubus).
 Jade Augustine, local Artist.

Politics and public service 
 Elmer L. Andersen, 30th governor of Minnesota, was a resident of Forest Lake.
 James B. Bullard, chief executive officer and president of the Federal Reserve Bank of St. Louis, raised in Forest Lake and is a graduate of Forest Lake Area High School.
 Arne Carlson, former Governor of Minnesota, is a former resident of Forest Lake.
 Pete Hegseth, Fox News Channel contributor, raised in Forest Lake and is a graduate of Forest Lake Area High School.
 William Rush Merriam, served as Governor of Minnesota from 1889 to 1893, was a summer resident of Forest Lake.
 Walter Mondale, former vice president of the United States, was a former resident of Forest Lake.
 Doug Swenson, Minnesota state representative, lawyer, and judge, was a resident of Forest Lake.

Newsmakers
 T. Eugene Thompson, attorney, summer resident who hired a hit man to kill his wife in St. Paul, in a story that made front pages around the country in 1963.
 Bugs Moran, Chicago Prohibition-era gangster, who lost seven members of his gang in the Saint Valentine's Day Massacre. Lived in Forest Lake off and on in the 1930s.

Sports 
 Rick Bayless, 1986 All-Big 10 and Minnesota Vikings running back, is a graduate of Forest Lake Area High School.
 Brandon Girtz, mixed martial artist, born and raised in Forest Lake and is a graduate of Forest Lake Area High School.
 Bud Grant, Hall of Fame football coach, lived in Forest Lake in the 1950s, and played for Forest Lake's town baseball team.
 Nora Greenwald (aka Molly Holly), former WWE world champion pro wrestler, was born in Forest Lake and is a graduate of Forest Lake Area High School.
 Adam Haayer, former Tennessee Titans, Minnesota Vikings and Arizona Cardinals lineman, is a graduate of Forest Lake Area High School.
 Hal Haskins, national champion college and professional basketball player, lived in Forest Lake and coached at Forest Lake Area High School.
 Wilfred T. Houle, National Football League player, born in Forest Lake in 1901.
 Dave Menne, former UFC (Ultimate Fighting Championship) middleweight champion, is a graduate of Forest Lake Area High School.
 Dick Nesbitt, National Football League running back/television sportscaster, was a longtime resident of Forest Lake.
 Leif Nordgren, two-time Winter Olympic Games biathlon competitor, is a graduate of Forest Lake Area High School.
 Bud Nygren, professional football player and college coach, grew up in Forest Lake  and graduated from Forest Lake Area High School in 1936.
 Arron Oberholser, professional golfer, was a former resident.
 Brian Raabe, former major league baseball player, is a Forest Lake resident and coached at Forest Lake Area High School.
 Jack Trudeau, former University of Illinois and Indianapolis Colts quarterback, was born in Forest Lake in 1962.
 Matt Wallner, All-American college baseball player, drafted by the Minnesota Twins, made his major league debut with the Twins in September, 2022. Was born in Forest Lake in 1997.

References

External links
 City of Forest Lake – Official Website

Cities in Minnesota
Cities in Washington County, Minnesota
Populated places established in 1874
1874 establishments in Minnesota